Helicia fuscotomentosa is a plant in the family Proteaceae. The bark is mottled grey and black. The flowers are reddish brown. Its habitat is forests from sea level to  altitude. H. fuscotomentosa is endemic to Borneo.

References

fuscotomentosa
Endemic flora of Borneo
Trees of Borneo
Plants described in 1950